Frank Richter may refer to:
Frank Richter Sr. (1837–1910), Canadian rancher and settler of British Columbia
Frank Richter Jr. (1910–1977), Canadian politician and son of the above
Frank Richter (footballer) (born 1952), German footballer
Frank Richter (rower) (born 1964), German rower

See also
Francis Richter (disambiguation)